Shannon or Shannon Town, named after the river near which it stands, is a town in County Clare, Ireland. It was given town status on 1 January 1982. The town is located just off the N19 road, a spur of the N18/M18 road between Limerick and Ennis. It is the location of Shannon Airport, an international airport serving the Clare/Limerick region in the west of Ireland.

History
Shannon is a new town. Spearheaded by Brendan O'Regan, it was built in the 1960s on reclaimed marshland alongside Shannon Airport, along with the Shannon Free Zone industrial estate. The residential areas were intended as a home for the thousands of workers at the airport, surrounding industries and support services. Population growth was never as fast as planned throughout the first few decades of the town's existence. This was partly due to the proximity of 'friendly' places to live, such as Ennis town and Limerick city, or even the nearby village of Newmarket-on-Fergus.

The 'planned' nature of this town did not necessarily result in a successful town. It was lacking in facilities, and the town's shopping centre was also of poor design. Shops fronted onto pedestrian malls that were originally uncovered, allowing estuary winds and rain to strike at shoppers. The early low-cost housing (tower-block flats located in Drumgeely, near the airport) was poor-quality terraced housing.

Shannon was originally located in the parish of Newmarket-on-Fergus in the Roman Catholic Diocese of Killaloe, and at first a priest in residence of the airport served the population. In 1966 St. Senan’s School was opened and Mary Immaculate Church was built on Corrib Drive. On 24 December 1967 the parish of Shannon was created. For a short period a group of Dominican Sisters of England had a community in the parish. In 1974 they were replaced by the Sisters of Mercy. The church of Saints John and Paul was opened in Tullyvarraga in 1980. 
Other churches are the Adoration Chapel in Shannon Town Centre and the Shannon Airport Oratory.
The Church of Ireland community is served by the Drumcliffe Union and the Methodist community is served by a lay pastor. Shannon is also home of Christian evangelical churches, Shannon Christian Church and New Life Christian Church.

St. John’s Church of Ireland School was the first school established in Shannon in 1962. Christ Church Shannon opened in 1962, also serving members of the reformed faiths,  but it is now closed.

Shannon was the manufacturing base of GAC Ireland, which built almost all buses for CIÉ during its short existence between 1980 and 1986.

Development
The population grew in the 1990s, and new modern housing developments were built. Improvements to facilities in the town included the opening of a second major supermarket, Lidl, with the shopping centre being expanded by the addition of the "skycourt" complex.

The main road through Shannon was remodelled following the opening of the bypass of Newmarket-on-Fergus. New units continued to open in the industrial estates.

Education 

Shannon town has six primary schools: St. Tola's, St John's, St Senan's, Gaelscoil Donnacha Rua, St. Conaire's (largest primary school) and St. Aidan's, including a Gaelscoil (Gaelscoil Donncha Rua) and a school under the patronage of Church of Ireland (St. Johns NS).

There are two second level education institutes in the town, St. Patrick's Comprehensive School and St. Caimin's Community School. St. Patrick's Comprehensive School opened in 1966 as Ireland's first comprehensive school. It has been serving the town since and is due an extension to increase its capacity to over 900 pupils.

There is one third level institution in Shannon: the Shannon College of Hotel Management, which opened in 1951. Since 2015 it has been an official college of the National University of Ireland, Galway.

Economy
Shannon Free Zone is Ireland's largest cluster of North American investments. Since its establishment in 1959, more than 110 overseas companies have chosen to open subsidiaries in Shannon. Major companies in Shannon include global market leaders as Element Six, Symantec, Avocent, AXA Partners, Lufthansa Technik, Mentor Graphics, RSA Security, Molex, GE Capital, Ingersoll Rand, Intel and Digital River. When Eirjet existed, its head office was located on the grounds of Shannon Airport.

Local government and politics

The town is administered at a local level by Clare County Council, preceded by Shannon Town Council, which in turn succeeded the Shannon Town Commissioners. In addition, prior to September 2004, Shannon Development, a state-sponsored body had charge of many services normally provided by local authorities in Ireland. This gave Shannon a unique status in local governance. In September 2004 its situation was regularised when Shannon Development transferred its local government functions to Clare County Council. The company retains responsibility for the Shannon Free Zone.

Climate 
Climate in this area has mild differences between highs and lows, and there is adequate rainfall year-round.  The Köppen Climate Classification subtype for this climate is "Cfb" (Marine West Coast Climate/Oceanic climate).

Twin towns – sister cities
Shannon is twinned with:
 Guingamp, France, since 1991

See also

List of towns and villages in Ireland

References

External links 

Official site 

Towns and villages in County Clare
Parishes of the Roman Catholic Diocese of Killaloe
New towns in the Republic of Ireland
Populated places established in the 1960s
New towns started in the 1960s